Columbia International School (コロンビアインターナショナルスクール) is an international school located in  (松郷), Tokorozawa, Saitama. It is a combined elementary, lower and upper Secondary education.

References

External links
 Columbia "International" School 

Education in Saitama Prefecture
Elementary schools in Japan
High schools in Saitama Prefecture
Canadian international schools in Japan
1988 establishments in Japan
Educational institutions established in 1988